"Salute the Flag: March & Two-Step" is a World War I song written and composed by William T. Pierson. It was published in 1914 by Church, Paxson & Company, in New York, NY. This song is written in the style of a march and two-step. 

The sheet music cover, illustrated by Pfeiffer, depicts a battleship speeding across the ocean.  The sheet music can be found at the Pritzker Military Museum & Library, as well as The University of Maine.

References 

Bibliography
Parker, Bernard S. World War I Sheet Music 2. Jefferson: McFarland & Company, Inc., 2007. . 

1914 songs
Songs of World War I
March music